The Paris ePrix is an annual race of the single-seater, electrically powered Formula E championship, held in Paris, France. It was first raced in the 2015-16 season.

Circuit

Circuit des Invalides

It goes clock-wise around Les Invalides with the Musée de l'Armée and the tomb of Napoleon. The pit lane is located along the Esplanade des Invalides, north of Les Invalides. It is characterised by a slippery surface, and a short section at turn 3 with new tarmac temporarily placed over the cobblestones. It also featured the tightest pit lane between turns 14 and 1 in the entire calendar due to the tight hairpin turn before rejoining the track.

Results

References 

 
Paris
Auto races in France
International sports competitions hosted by Paris
Recurring sporting events established in 2016
2016 establishments in France